Life on Other Planets is the fourth album by English alternative rock band Supergrass. It is the first album that includes Rob Coombes as an official member of the band, and originally went under the working title of Get Lost. The American edition of the album included many bonus tracks and rare live editions. One of these live editions became infamous when it was discovered you can hear a gunshot in the background of the song. It peaked at #9 in the UK charts.<ref>{{cite web |url=http://www.strangeones.com/music/78_04.htm |title=Life on Other Planets |publisher=strangeones.com |accessdate=9 September 2011}}</ref>

Concept
The band claim that much of the inspiration for this album was gleaned from a "working holiday" in the Côte d'Azur, Southern France together, listening to the French radio station Nostalgie and watching Carl Sagan documentaries on the cosmos. Carl Sagan and Douglas Adams are in fact mentioned on the reverse of Life on Other Planets under a list of people Supergrass would like to thank.

The naming of the album was influenced by this excursion, but also by a telescope which qualified astrophysicist and keyboard player Rob Coombes, would bring with him to the recording studio in order to see the planets; "...we got fascinated on everything above us and came up with the title," explained Mick Quinn.

The band hired an outside producer, Tony Hoffer, for the record, having felt that their last release, Supergrass, lacked some of the urgency of their previous albums: "He helped us keep the takes quite short and sweet", says Danny Goffey. "We really didn't mess around because he kept us moving. If we had done it on our own again, we'd just get really analytical and start crying and trying to mend things that weren't broken."

The album was debuted at Meltdown festival in London's Royal Festival Hall on 28 June 2002, the edition curated by David Bowie.

ReceptionLife on Other Planets'' was met with generally favourable reviews from music critics. At Metacritic, which assigns a normalized rating out of 100 to reviews from mainstream publications, the album received an average score of 74, based on 21 reviews.

Track listing
All tracks written by Supergrass (as Rob Coombes officially was a band member effective this album).

CD 5418002 Limited edition 12" (with free poster) 5418001
"Za" – 3:04
"Rush Hour Soul" – 2:55
"Seen the Light" – 2:25
"Brecon Beacons" – 2:56
"Can't Get Up" – 4:02
"Evening of the Day" – 5:18 The track is in fact a tribute to Spinal Tap song "All the Way Home", with the lyric "If she's not on that 3:15, then I'm gonna know what sorrow means."
"Never Done Nothing Like That Before" – 1:43
"Funniest Thing" – 2:29
"Grace" – 2:30
"La Song" – 3:43
"Prophet 15" – 4:05
"Run" – 5:28

CD TOCP 66003 (Japan only)
The Japanese release of the album has the same track listing as above, but with the addition of:

<li>"Velvetine" – 3:39
<li>"Electric Cowboy" – 5:09

Enhanced CD 440 063 685-2 (US only)
This contained the same tracks as the standard release, but the enhanced section consisted of the following:
"Grace" (video) – 2:37
"Seen the Light" (video) – 2:45

Personnel
 Gaz Coombes – lead vocals, guitar, bass guitar on track 6
 Mick Quinn – bass guitar, backing vocals, guitar on track 6, lead vocals on tracks 6, 7 & 10
 Rob Coombes – keyboards
 Danny Goffey – drums, backing vocals

Charts

References

External links

Life on Other Planets at YouTube (streamed copy where licensed)

Supergrass albums
2002 albums
Albums produced by Tony Hoffer
Parlophone albums
Albums recorded at Rockfield Studios
Albums with cover art by The Designers Republic